Thainston is a farm complex and national historic district in La Plata, Charles County, Maryland, United States. The main house is a two-story, L-shaped brick house built in 1865 and enlarged early in the 20th century. It was designed by Eben Faxon, a Baltimore architect, and constructed under the supervision of Charles Ogle, a building contractor also from Baltimore. The farm developed between 1865 and the 1930s. Included on the property are a number of early dependencies, including a wellhouse, a brick dairy, a storage building, and a meathouse. A frame garage and large chicken house, both dating from the early 1900s, are on the property. There is also a collection of agricultural buildings including: tobacco barns, cattle barns, and equipment sheds clustered around a corncrib/granary. There are three frame tenant houses, several associated sheds, a probably early building site, an early well, a pit remaining from a former ice house, and the former ice ponds. Another early-20th century building, a tobacco barn, stands in a field to the west of the main grouping of agricultural buildings.

Thainston was added to the National Register of Historic Places in 1990.

References

External links
, including photo dated 1989, at Maryland Historical Trust

Historic districts in Charles County, Maryland
Farms on the National Register of Historic Places in Maryland
Historic districts on the National Register of Historic Places in Maryland
National Register of Historic Places in Charles County, Maryland